Garnieria is a monotypic plant genus in the family Proteaceae. Molecular hylogenetic studies indicate that it is nested in the larger Australian genus Persoonia where it may be included. It is endemic to New Caledonia where the type specimen was collected at Prony Bay in 1868–1870 by Benjamin Balansa. The only species is Garnieria spathulifolia.

Description 
The plant grows as a shrub up to 2 m in height, sometimes a small tree up to 4 m. Its shiny leaves are dark green above, paler below. The fruits are green at first, becoming dark crimson to brown. The flowers are white and scented.

References 

Proteaceae
Endemic flora of New Caledonia
Monotypic Proteaceae genera
Taxa named by Adolphe-Théodore Brongniart
Taxa named by Jean Antoine Arthur Gris